Bueng Si Fai is a freshwater lake in central Thailand located in Nai Mueang Subdistrict, Mueang Phichit District, Phichit Province.

Characteristics
Its name is roughly translated as "Fire Mill Marsh" regarded as an important source of freshwater fish breeding and also habitat for variety of birds. Bueng Si Fai is an oxbow lake by received water flowing from the Nan River. It is also considered a shallow lake, due to the depth of about 1.5–2 m (4–6 ft) only. This lake has a border with four tambons (subdistricts) of Mueang Phichit District, namely Tha Luang, Rong Chang, Khlong Khachen and Mueang Kao.

Originally, Bueng Si Fai was more than 10,000 rai (about 3,952 acres). Nowadays, it is reduced to only 5,390 rai (about 2,094 acres) which is affected by the opening of the Sirikit Dam. It is the fifth-largest  freshwater lake in Thailand after Bueng Boraphet, Nong Han Lake, Bueng Lahan, Kwan Phayao, respectively.

Along the banks is a beautifully landscaped suitable for recreation and photography.

Places of interest

There are many places of interest around the lake:

Chaloem Prakiat Aquarium (สถานแสดงพันธุ์ปลาเฉลิมพระเกียรติ), is a striking nine-sided building stands on path pushes out into the lake operated by Inland Aquaculture Research and Development, Regional Center 3 (Phichit). Inside exhibiting a variety of species of both native and exotic fish such as Java barbs, tinfoil barbs, blue sheatfishes, glass catfishes, Asian arowana, crystal-eyed catfish, silver arowana, black ghost knifefishes as well as preserved endangered species giant freshwater stingrays and Siamese crocodiles which once they had lived here.
Princess Mother's Garden Phichit (สวนสมเด็จพระศรีนครินทร์ พิจิตร), a public park on lakeside with area of 170 rai (about 67 acres) built to honour Princess Srinagarindra in 1984.
Crocodile Pond and Zoo (บ่อเลี้ยงจระเข้และสวนสัตว์), a pond for keeping crocodiles visitors can buy chicken ribs here to feed these crocodiles. Moreover, adjoining is also a zoo that shows some animals such as ostriches etc.
Giant Crocodile Statue (รูปปั้นจระเข้ยักษ์), regarded as the landmark of the lake built according to folklore of Phichit, Krai Thong and Chalawan. Lies in front of the lake inside the statue is a meeting room of 25 to 30 seats.

References

External links

Lakes of Thailand
Tourist attractions in Phichit province